Torodora moriyasu is a moth in the family Lecithoceridae. It was described by Kyu-Tek Park in 2002. It is found in Thailand.

The wingspan is 14–15 mm. The forewings are light brown with blackish spots near the middle of the cell and below it, as well as two discal spots at the upper and lower corner of the cell. The hindwings are grey.

Etymology
The species is named in honour of Dr. S. Moriuti and Dr. Y. Yoshiyasu.

References

Moths described in 2002
Torodora